Allison Ann Higson (born March 13, 1973), later known by her married name Allison Cavanaugh, is a former 2-time Olympic breaststroke, individual medley, and freestyle swimmer from Canada. Born in Mississauga, Ontario, she grew up in Brampton, Ontario, a suburb of Toronto. She now lives in Traverse City, Michigan with her husband, Sean, and 2 children.

At the 1986 Commonwealth Games in Edinburgh, Scotland, Higson won gold medals in the women's 100-metre and 200-metre breaststroke, setting new Commonwealth Records in both. Later that summer at the 1986 World Championships in Madrid, Spain, Higson captured a bronze medal in the 200-metre breaststroke event.

At the 1988 Canadian Olympic Trials, in Montreal, Quebec, at the age of 15, Higson broke the women's 200-metre breaststroke World Record in a time of 2:27:27, previously held by Silke Hoerner of East Germany.

Higson also competed at the 1992 Summer Olympics in Barcelona, Spain, in the preliminary heats of the 100-metre and 200-metre freestyle, and placed eighth in final of the women's 4x100-metre freestyle relay as a member of Canada's team.

See also
 List of Olympic medalists in swimming (women)
 World record progression 200 metres breaststroke

References

1973 births
Living people
Canadian female breaststroke swimmers
Canadian female freestyle swimmers
Commonwealth Games gold medallists for Canada
Commonwealth Games silver medallists for Canada
World record setters in swimming
Swimmers at the 1986 Commonwealth Games
Swimmers at the 1990 Commonwealth Games
Olympic bronze medalists in swimming
Olympic swimmers of Canada
Swimmers at the 1988 Summer Olympics
Swimmers at the 1992 Summer Olympics
Swimmers from Mississauga
World Aquatics Championships medalists in swimming
Medalists at the 1988 Summer Olympics
Olympic bronze medalists for Canada
Commonwealth Games medallists in swimming
20th-century Canadian women
Medallists at the 1986 Commonwealth Games
Medallists at the 1990 Commonwealth Games